Jacksonoides is a spider genus of the jumping spider family, Salticidae.

Species
As of June 2017, the World Spider Catalog lists the following species in the genus:
 Jacksonoides atypicus Żabka & Patoleta, 2016 – Queensland
 Jacksonoides blaszaki Żabka & Patoleta, 2016 – Queensland 
 Jacksonoides cameronae Żabka & Patoleta, 2016 – Queensland 
 Jacksonoides deelemanae Żabka & Patoleta, 2016 – Queensland 
 Jacksonoides distinctus Wanless, 1988 – Queensland
 Jacksonoides dziabaszewskii Żabka & Patoleta, 2016 – Queensland 
 Jacksonoides eileenae Wanless, 1988 – Queensland
 Jacksonoides jacksoni Żabka & Patoleta, 2016 –  Queensland 
 Jacksonoides kochi (Simon, 1900) – Queensland
 Jacksonoides lucynae Żabka & Patoleta, 2016 – Queensland 
 Jacksonoides nubilis Wanless, 1988 – Queensland
 Jacksonoides queenslandicus Wanless, 1988 – Queensland
 Jacksonoides simplexipalpis Wanless, 1988 – Queensland
 Jacksonoides subtilis Wanless, 1988 – Queensland
 Jacksonoides venustus Żabka & Patoleta, 2016 –  Queensland 
 Jacksonoides voyteki Żabka & Patoleta, 2016 – Queensland

References

Salticidae
Fauna of Queensland
Spiders of Australia
Salticidae genera